The Virginia State Trojans (also VSU Trojans) are the athletic teams that represent Virginia State University, located in Petersburg, Virginia, in NCAA Division II intercollegiate sports. The Trojans compete as members of the Central Intercollegiate Athletic Association for all 14 varsity sports. Virginia State has been a member of the CIAA since 1920.

Varsity teams

List of teams
The trojans field 7 men's and 7 women's sports teams, including:

Men's sports
 Baseball
 Basketball
 Cross Country
 Football
 Golf
 Tennis
 Track & Field

Women's sports
 Basketball
 Bowling
 Cross Country
 Softball
 Tennis
 Track & Field
 Volleyball

References

External links